Dental Depot is an American dental practice based in Oklahoma City, United States. It has offices in Moore, Edmond, Yukon, Norman, Oklahoma City, and Midwest City as well as the Tulsa area.

History
Dental Depot was founded by Dr. Glenn Ashmore in 1978, and is still a family-owned and operated dental practice. In March 2017, the company expanded its offering by starting dental implant services and general dentistry services under the same roof, reportedly by The Oklahoman. 

The company hits $60 Million annual revenue in 2017.

See also

All Smiles Dental Centers 
ReachOut Healthcare America 
Small Smiles Dental Centers 
American Dental Association

References

External links
Dental Depot Website
Teeth Whitening Clinic

1978 establishments in Oklahoma
Companies based in Oklahoma City
Dental companies of the United States
Health care companies based in Oklahoma